The 2015–16 Fresno State Bulldogs women's basketball team represent California State University, Fresno during the 2015–16 NCAA Division I women's basketball season. The Bulldogs, led by second year head coach Jaime White, play their home games at the Save Mart Center and were members of the Mountain West Conference. They finished the season 22–12, 15–3 in Mountain West play to finish in second place. They advanced to the championship game of the Mountain West women's tournament where they lost to Colorado State. They received an automatic big to the Women's National Invitation Tournament where they defeated Santa Clara in the first round before losing to Oregon in the second round.

Roster

Schedule

|-
!colspan=9 style="background:#FF0000; color:#000080;"| Exitbition

|-
!colspan=9 style="background:#FF0000; color:#000080;"| Non-conference regular season

|-
!colspan=9 style="background:#FF0000; color:#000080;"| Mountain West regular season

|-
!colspan=9 style="background:#FF0000; color:#000080;"| Mountain West tournament

|-
!colspan=9 style="background:#FF0000; color:#000080;"| WNIT

See also
2015–16 Fresno State Bulldogs men's basketball team

References

Fresno State Bulldogs women's basketball seasons
Fresno State
2016 Women's National Invitation Tournament participants
Fresno
Fresno